A-Channel was a Canadian television system that operated in Manitoba and Alberta from 1997 to 2005.  The stations have since become a part of the Citytv network.

A-Channel may also refer to:
 A (TV system), previously known as NewNet from 1995 to 2005 and A-Channel from 2005 to 2008, a Canadian television system that operated in Vancouver Island, Southern Ontario and Atlantic Canada (now CTV 2)
 A Channel (manga), is a Japanese four-panel comic strip by bb Kuroda
 A-type ion channels, a type of protein found in nerve cell membranes